Ivan Ivanovych Turyanytsia (25 May 1901 – 27 March 1955) was a Czechoslovak, Ukrainian and Soviet politician, who served as the chairman of the People's Council of Zakarpattia Ukraine from 1944 to 1946 and the First secretary of the Communist Party of Zakarpattia Ukraine.

On several occasions he was elected to the Central Committee of the Communist Party (b) of Ukraine.

Turyanytsia was born in a village of Ryapid near Khust.

During the World War I he served as a soldier of the Austria-Hungary army, later in 1919 in the Zakarpattia Red Guards of the Hungarian Soviet Republic. The same year Turyanytsia was arrested and placed in concentration camp in Presov, but by December 1919 he was released.

In 1924–1925 Turyanytsia served in the Czechoslovak Army and after that joined the Communist Party of Czechoslovakia (KSC). In 1927–1928 he was a chairman of the Mukacheve Trade Union of Builders and then in 1928–1929 a secretary of the Mukacheve city committee of the KSC. In 1929 Turyanytsia was arrested again, but then soon was released.

In 1930 Turyanytsia was a secretary of the Uzhhorod zupa committee KSC. In 1930–1933 he studied in the Soviet Union and graduated the Kharkiv Communist Institute of Journalism. In 1933–1939 he was a secretary of the Subcarpathian regional council of Red Trade Unions. During that period in 1936 he was arrested one more time, but again soon was released.

In March 1939 Turyanytsia emigrated to the Soviet Union and joined the International Red Aid organization (1939–1940). In 1940–1941 he worked as an economist planner at the Steam Locomotive Factory of the October Revolution (today Luhanskteplovoz) in Voroshilovgrad.

In 1943–1944 Turyanytsia commanded the 3rd Brigade of the Soviet Czechoslovak Corps. Upon liberation of the Carpathian Ruthenia in 1944, he became the 1st secretary of the Communist Party of Zakarpattia Ukraine and a chairman of the People's Council of Zakarpattia Ukraine. In 1944–1945 he also played a key role in the deportation of the local German-speaking civilian population out of Zakarpattia.

Since 1947 Turyanytsia was a member of the Presidium of the Verkhovna Rada and since 1949 the Central Committee of the Communist Party (Bolsheviks) of Ukraine. He was a member of the Supreme Soviet of the Soviet Union 2nd and 3rd convocations and the Verkhovna Rada 2nd–4th convocations.

References

External links
Profile in the Handbook on history of the Communist Party and the Soviet Union 1898–1991

1901 births
1955 deaths
People from Zakarpattia Oblast
Communist Party of Czechoslovakia politicians
Communist Party of Ukraine (Soviet Union) politicians
Central Committee of the Communist Party of Ukraine (Soviet Union) members
Second convocation members of the Verkhovna Rada of the Ukrainian Soviet Socialist Republic
Third convocation members of the Verkhovna Rada of the Ukrainian Soviet Socialist Republic
Fourth convocation members of the Verkhovna Rada of the Ukrainian Soviet Socialist Republic
Second convocation members of the Supreme Soviet of the Soviet Union
Third convocation members of the Supreme Soviet of the Soviet Union
Recipients of the Order of Lenin
20th-century Ukrainian politicians
Czechoslovak emigrants to the Soviet Union